Berberis wilsoniae, Mrs. Wilson's barberry, is a species of flowering plant in the family Berberidaceae. It is native to Tibet, south-central China, and Myanmar, and has been introduced to the North and South Islands of New Zealand. It is a mound-forming, deer-resistant shrub, with blueish-green leaves that turn red in Autumn and yellow flowers that produce translucent pink fruit. A number of cultivars are available.

References

wilsoniae
Ornamental plants
Flora of Tibet
Flora of South-Central China
Flora of Myanmar
Plants described in 1906